The Vergu-Mănăilă house is the oldest surviving building in Buzău, Romania. An 18th century boyar's mansion, renovated between 1971 and 1974, it hosts a museum of ethnography and folk art.

Notes

References

Buildings and structures in Buzău
Ethnographic museums in Romania
Rural history museums in Europe
Museums in Buzău County